The International Maritime University of Panama (in Spanish: Universidad Marítima Internacional de Panamá, UMIP) is a maritime college in Panama City, Panama. It trains cadets to become merchant marine ships' officers. It is located in the Albrook area of Panama City, on the site of the former Albrook Air Force Base.

Today, the Maritime university is experiencing one of its best times.  Their cadets are recognized for their leadership, respect, honor, loyalty, discipline, and non-tolerance of dishonest acts.  It belongs to the international association of maritime universities, being the only one in Central and South America to achieve this step.

Its main building (Building 810 in Albrook) was severely damaged by a fire in January 2008, although there were no injuries or fatalities. The fire is believed to have started in a storage area on the building's top floor.

UMIP was established by a law passed in 2005, and it absorbed the former Escuela Náutica de Panamá, which was founded in 1958.

The university's rector (president) is  Víctor Luna Barahona.

Cadets Corp

To create leaders, the UMIP established and executed a discipline system Cadet Corp, proposed and defended by all, which institutes the habits that eventually become culture, as a result of the individual. The UMIP trains cadets by leading them through a continuous and focused process in the enhancement of values and competences that train the individual for life and for work in the sea.

Under command of the merchant marine captain, Eduardo Thompson, UMIP has a strong and stable cadet regiment.  The regiment is divided between platoons: Alpha, Bravo, Charlie, Delta, Echo, Band Company and the outstanding Honor Guard. In addition to the captain, the cadets choose among them their representatives before the school of leadership, who are: 
Brigadier higher 
Executive Brigadier 
Administrative Brigadier 
Leadership chief 
Chief of student dining room
Chief of Alpha platoon.
Chief of Bravo Platoon 
Chief of Charlie Platoon 
Chief of Delta Platoon 
Chief of Echo platoon 
Honor Guard Chief

References

External links

Martín Torrijos, President of Panama - Discurso en Sanción de Ley que crea la Universidad Marítima Internacional de Panamá (Speech on signing the law establishing UMIP), December 1, 2005

Maritime colleges
Universities in Panama
Buildings and structures in Panama City
Education in Panama City